Toto the Third Man is a 1951 Italian comedy film directed by Mario Mattoli and starring Totò.

Plot
In a small village Peter and Paul (both starring Toto), twin brothers of opposite characters, Peter, mayor of the town, is gruff, precise, picky all of a piece and never lets talk about his wife (Bice Valori), is totally different from his brother Paul, who loves the good life and beautiful women, such as the innkeeper's wife Oreste (Carlo Campanini) at the expense of his wife. The dispute between the two brothers is affecting the whole country, because the construction of the new prison, which will give bread and work for all, will be built on land owned by Paul and despite already there is a municipal resolution acquisition of land by part of the town, Peter refuses to carry out the transaction with his brother, blocking the start of work, because they are afraid you might think that makes favoritism to his brother. A groped to take advantage of the situation will try Anacleto (Aroldo Tieri), the tailor of the country, more good to baste clothes that fraud, that he met in jail Toto, the third secret twin brother of Peter and Paul, and once released from jail instructed him to go to Peter's house, pretending to be the latter and give the money owed to Paul for the sale of the land.

The staging generates a series of misunderstandings, because Toto, in the role of Peter, despite instructions Anacleto to resemble in all respects, they behave totally different from the grumpy mayor, producing many misunderstandings, but emerged in hands empty because the money was put directly delivered by the municipal home of Paul. To recover, Toto come on at the home of Paul, pretending to be the latter and creating other misunderstandings with his wife and with the busty maid of the same, but did not recover the money due to the arrival of the real Paul. Peter and Paul, respectively convinced that the other is joined at home by pretending to be him, should be reported to the prosecutor, so she goes to stage a surreal process without rhyme or reason, Toto is kidnapped by the host Oreste believing that Paul wants to do out of jealousy; Toto manages to escape with the help of the town drunkard, the only one who had seen Toto Paul is out of the house of the latter, but it had been believed that regularly drunk. Meanwhile, in court, in the general confusion, someone begins to suspect that there may be a third brother, in this case Peter is ready to give him his fishing hut and Paul his guns and his hunting dogs. At this point, Toto reaches the court to reveal the whole truth. For the third brother finally promises a peaceful and prosperous life (thanks to the heritage of his brothers) in the company of the beautiful ex-maid of Paul.

Cast
 Totò: Pietro-Paolo-Totò
 Franca Marzi: Caterina, domestica di Paolo
 Elli Parvo: Teresa, moglie di Paolo
 Carlo Campanini: Oreste
 Aroldo Tieri: Anacleto, il sarto
 Alberto Sorrentino: Giovannino
 Mario Castellani: Mario
 Fulvia Mammi: Anna
 Carlo Romano: commendatore Buttafava
 Franco Pastorino: Giacometto
 Ada Dondini: nonna di Giacometto
 Diana Dei: Clara
 Ughetto Bertucci: Ughetto 
 Guglielmo Inglese: cancelliere 
 Enzo Garinei: segretario comunale Cicognetti
 Bice Valori: moglie di Piero
 Pina Gallini: cameriera del sindaco
 Aldo Giuffrè: l'avvocato 
 Gino Cavalieri

References

Bibliography

External links

1951 films
1951 comedy films
1950s Italian-language films
Italian black-and-white films
Films directed by Mario Mattoli
Films produced by Carlo Ponti
Films produced by Dino De Laurentiis
Films with screenplays by Age & Scarpelli
Italian comedy films
1950s Italian films